List table of the properties and districts — listed on the California Historical Landmarks — within Calaveras County, California. 

Note: Click the "Map of all coordinates" link to the right to view a Google map of all properties and districts with latitude and longitude coordinates in the table below.

Listings

|}

See also

List of California Historical Landmarks
National Register of Historic Places listings in Calaveras County, California

References

 

 
 

. 
List of California Historical Landmarks
H01
Protected areas of Calaveras County, California
California Gold Rush
Calaveras County, California
History of the Sierra Nevada (United States)
Landmarks in Calaveras County